Josh Johnson is an American football running back who is a free agent. He played college football at Louisiana–Monroe.

Professional career

Johnson was signed by the Seattle Seahawks as an undrafted free agent on May 13, 2020. He was waived on August 31, 2021, during final roster cuts, but re-signed to the team's practice squad the following day. Johnson was elevated to the active roster on November 29, 2021, for the team's Week 12 game against the Washington Football Team. He was signed to the active roster on January 4, 2022.

On August 30, 2022, Johnson was waived/injured by the Seahawks and placed on injured reserve. He was released on September 8.

References

External links
Louisiana–Monroe Warhawks bio
Seattle Seahawks bio

Living people
American football running backs
Louisiana–Monroe Warhawks football players
Seattle Seahawks players
Players of American football from Alabama
1997 births